Ziętara is a Polish surname. Notable people with the surname include:

Jarosław Ziętara (1968–1992), Polish journalist
Maciej Ziętara (born 1971), Polish translator, civil servant, and diplomat
Walenty Ziętara (born 1948), Polish ice hockey player

Polish-language surnames